Moulay Ali Cherif Airport  is an airport serving Errachidia (Er-Rachidia), a town in the Drâa-Tafilalet region in Morocco.

Facilities

Airlines and destinations
The following airlines operate regular scheduled and charter flights at Er-Rachidia Airport:

References

External links
 
 

Airports in Morocco
Buildings and structures in Drâa-Tafilalet